"She Used To Be Mine" is a song written by Ronnie Dunn, and recorded by American country music duo Brooks & Dunn.  It was released in August 1993 as the third single from their album Hard Workin' Man.  The song reached the top of the Billboard Hot Country Singles & Tracks (now Hot Country Songs) chart, becoming their fifth Number One single.

Chart positions
"She Used to Be Mine" debuted at number 60 on the U.S. Billboard Hot Country Singles & Tracks for the week of September 4, 1993.

Year-end charts

References

1993 singles
1993 songs
Brooks & Dunn songs
Songs written by Ronnie Dunn
Song recordings produced by Scott Hendricks
Song recordings produced by Don Cook
Arista Nashville singles